Euan Cameron is Henry Luce III Professor of Reformation Church History at Union Theological Seminary. He has a D.Phil from the University of Oxford. His work focuses on the Reformation and religion in the Late Middle Ages.

References

Union Theological Seminary (New York City) faculty
Alumni of the University of Oxford
Reformation historians
People educated at Eton College
Year of birth missing (living people)
Living people